Sersa Group is a Swiss railtrack construction and maintenance company.

History
Sersa (Soudage électrique des rails S.A.) was founded in 1948 in Neuchâtel by Arnold Schnyder as a rail track maintenance company operating on the rail system around Zurich, Switzerland. Arnold Schnyder's son Konrad took over the company and expanded the business to cover track infrastructure work throughout Switzerland, as well as establishing subsidiaries abroad. (Germany, UK, Netherlands, Ireland, Canada, Spain).

Operations

The company supplies services relating to rail track construction and renewals; including ballasted and slab track construction, catenary construction, and project management. Maintenance of track including ballast cleaning and tamping, rail inspection, welding, grinding and milling, and operates and leases a variety of machinery such as tamping machines, cranes, grinding trains and ballast cleaning machines.

Subsidiaries
The company has subsidiaries in the United Kingdom, and the Netherlands; Sersa (UK) Ltd. and Sersa BV. In 2009 the group acquired the Canadian track construction and maintenance company Total Track.

References

External links

Railway infrastructure companies
Rail infrastructure in Switzerland
Transport companies of Switzerland